Insiders is a Spanish reality television series hosted by Najwa Nimri. It premiered on Netflix on October 21, 2021.

Premise
Thirteen contestants are gathered in a 1,600 square-meter studio under the guise of the final stage of the casting process for a reality show. What they do not know is that, in fact, they are already in the show: cameras are secretly filming them during all their stay in the area. The objective of this is to catch contestants off guard and make them confront the differences in their behavior between the times they know they are being filmed and the times they think they are not. The winner will earn a €100,000 prize.

Season 1 (2021)

Contestants

Results and elimination

Season 2 (2022)
During a press conference for Netflix's Spanish originals at the 2021 Vitoria FesTVal, Álvaro Díaz, Netflix Spain's director of non-fiction content, confirmed that a second season had already been filmed. Season 2 premiered on May 19, 2022. Laura and Peter from Season 1 returned as 'mole' contestants, trained by the show's crew for a special assignment.

Contestants

Results and elimination

Episodes

Series Overview

Season 1 (2021)

Season 2 (2022)

Critical reception
Insiders was met with positive to mixed reviews in Spain, being hailed as a return to the essence of reality television. FormulaTV's Sergio Navarro compared the show to American television series Unreal, noting that it showed the crew plotting where the show was heading. "And it is thrilling to witness those private meetings, unbeknownst to the contestants, where you can see how they weave the twists and turns and how they come together to create an exciting program."

Bluper's Juan M. Fernández also picked up on the comparison to Unreal, while praising the decision to keep the runtime at an hour or less per episode: "It was about time that shows with episodes of no more than 50 minutes were done in this country. The show wins with it. More so with such outstanding music. Insiders cuts to the chase, gets right down to business."

Espinof's Mikel Zorrilla was less impressed, noting that the format becomes overcomplicated in its attempt to keep contestants and viewers alike on their toes: "Insiders wants to outsmart everyone, at once trying to retrieve something unique and to constantly surprise. The mixture is striking at first, but there is a point where everything turns out kind of random, leaving the show at a strange middle ground between the search for something real and the completely manufactured."

For similar reasons, Decider's Joel Keller advised readers to skip the show, concluding: "There’s a good reality competition somewhere within the convoluted format of Insiders. But the pains the producers take to keep their secret from the contestants makes it all about the conceit and not the contestants themselves."

References

Notes

2021 Spanish television series debuts
Spanish reality television series
Spanish-language Netflix original programming